Otidea alutacea is a species of apothecial fungus belonging to the family Pyronemataceae. This European species appears as buff coloured deep cups, often split down one side, up to 6 cm tall, on soil in woodland. It is inedible.

The cup is 3–6 cm tall and 2–4 cm wide, normally split on one side to the base, with a wavy margin, brown outside and light brown inside. The spores are colorless.

Similar species include Otidea onotica and Guepinia helvelloides.

Gallery

References

Otidea alutacea at Species Fungorum

Pyronemataceae
Fungi described in 1801
Inedible fungi
Taxa named by Christiaan Hendrik Persoon